The 98th Pennsylvania House of Representatives District is located in Lebanon County and Lancaster County. Before the redistricting process in 2022, the district included parts of Dauphin County. Its former area included the following areas:

 Dauphin County
 Londonderry Township
 Lancaster County
 Columbia
 Conoy Township
 East Donegal Township
 Elizabethtown
 Lancaster County (continued)
 Marietta
 Mount Joy
 West Donegal Township
 West Hempfield Township (PART)
 District Farmdale 
 District Ironville

Representatives

Recent election results

References

Government of Dauphin County, Pennsylvania
Government of Lancaster County, Pennsylvania
98